This article describes the group stage of the 2017–18 Women's EHF Champions League.

Draw
The draw was held on 30 June 2017.

Seedings
The seedings were announced on 27 June 2017.

Groups
The matchdays were 6–8 October, 13–15 October, 20–22 October, 3–5 November, 10–12 November and 17–19 November 2017.

Group A

Group B

Group C

Group D

References

External links
Official website

Group stage